Kathy Barr (born Marilyn Sultana Aboulafia; June 4, 1929 – June 21, 2008) was an American vocalist who performed and recorded popular, jazz, musical theater, and operettas. Barr flourished from the 1950s through the mid-1960s in musical theater, nightclubs, television, and radio. She was acclaimed for her coloratura soprano range, three and one-half octaves by at least one account (see Annotations below, "Vocal Range Context"), and her ability to sing pop, jazz, and classical. Her stage name was drawn from the first and married surname of her maternal grandmother, Katie Barr.

Discography

Albums

Singles 

 ‡ Audio courtesy of YouTube

Radio transcription disc
  → via Rand's Esoteric OTR, a blog of Randy Riddle at randsesotericotr.podbean.com.  Note: The program, hosted by Lt. Bob Osterberg, USMC (né Robert Pierce Osterberg; 1929–2016), interviewed Kathy Barr and featured tracks from her new album, Follow Me. The show title, Magic in Music, is titled Magic of Music on the AFRTS disk label.

Musical theater roles
 Marinka, as Marinka (leading soprano role)
 Winter Garden Theatre, New York
 Australia touring production
 Tivoli circuit, Melbourne: Opened May 28, 1948, at the Tivoli Theater, Melbourne
 At the age of 19, Barr was elevated to the role of Marinka after being the understudy for Kathryn Grayson
 Wizard of Oz, as Dorothy Gale (leading soprano role)
 Pittsburgh Civic Light Opera, August 1 thru August 6, 1949

Family
Barr was born to Ovadia "Ovid" Aboulafia (1900–1978), who, himself, was born in Çeşme, Turkey, and Eabeta "Tessie" Barr (maiden; 1908–1978).

Barr – on June 20, 1954, in The Bronx – married Milton ("Milt" or "Milty") Leon Schwartz (1901–1992), who was  years older; and, he was co-owner with Ralph Mitchell (né Ralph Michelev; 1916–2004) of the acclaimed Chicago jazz club, the Preview Lounge at 7 West Randolph Street, that ran from about 1945 until the summer of 1960. At the same address, Schwartz and Mitchell also owned the Modern Jazz Room (formerly the Encore Room and formerly Mambo City), upstairs. Their marriage was annulled May 28, 1956, in the New York Supreme Court – refereed by Ed Koch, who went on to become Mayor of New York City. Schwartz had been a saxophonist with the Al Trace Orchestra.

News media, in 1958, reported that Aboulafia was changing her name to Kathy Barr. Barr, in 1965, in Manhattan, under her birth name, "Marilyn Aboulafia," married Irwin M. Glickman (1930–2011). Reflecting on her disappointment from her first marriage, Barr, in 1968, confided being happy in her second marriage but also declared, "this time, I wanted to work at it." And, she also expressed a desire to raise a family. Two years earlier, in 1966, Barr and Glickman had a daughter, Sylvia Beth Glickman, who, in 2005, married Jeffrey ("Jeff") Zina Johnston. Sylvia and Jeff had two sons, both born in Hollywood, Florida, John Michael Thunder Johnston, born in 2005, and Lightning James Marshall Hawk Johnston, born in 2008.

Until around 1968, Barr continued to perform club dates (one-nighters) and regional musical theater productions, including roles as (i) Billy Dawn (Judy Holliday's role) in Born Yesterday (November 25, 1967, through January 7, 1968) at the Hamlet Street Theater (now named the Rauh Theater) in Pittsburgh, and (ii) a hymn singer seeking to save men's souls in Guys and Dolls, starring Tony Martin, at the Meadowbrook Theater Restaurant in Cedar Grove, New Jersey (May 29, 1968, through June 30, 1968).

Bibliography

Annotations

Notes

References

  

  

  

  

 

 "Still good friends."

 

   ; ; .

  

    (publication);  (print),  (online);  (publication);  (article);  (article).

 

   ; ; .

 

 

 
Via:
 
 
 
 

 

  

 

  .
  
  

 
 
  

  
   (US Newsstream database)

External links

 

  

1929 births
2008 deaths
American people of Turkish descent
Singers from New York (state)
20th-century American singers
20th-century American women singers
21st-century American women